Dan Hudson (born April 2, 1959, in Oshawa, Ontario) is a Canadian artist and photojournalist.

Biography
Hudson received his Bachelor of Fine Arts at York University (Toronto) and did a studio residency at the Banff Centre. He lived in Toronto between 1979 and 1990 and since then has been based in the Bow Valley in the Canadian Rocky Mountains. Hudson's art and photography are informed by his enthusiasm for outdoor pursuits such as surfing, snowboarding, white water kayaking, mountain biking and wilderness adventure.

Photography
Hudson is an outdoor adventure photographer specializing in backcountry skiing and snowboarding. His photographs have been published in books, magazines, newspapers and websites around the world, including more than 50 international cover shots and have also been exhibited in museums and art galleries across Canada. Hudson's photographs are notable for their "extreme" action within magnificent mountain settings.

Art
Hudson's paintings and multimedia art works have been exhibited internationally and are represented in public and private collections throughout Canada, such as the Robert McLaughlin Gallery in Oshawa. He has won several awards for his art practice, and his work has a "cultural properties" designation by the Canadian Government.
Distinguishing characteristics of Hudson's art works are environmental themes and layers of imagery. In both life and art, Hudson is in a constant state of reinventing himself.

References

Sources

External links 
 Official website of Dan Hudson
 Centre for Contemporary Canadian Art
 Canadian Heritage information on "Cultural Property"
 Dan Hudson, Alberta Provincial Art Collection

1959 births
Living people
Sports photographers
Canadian photojournalists
Canadian video artists
Canadian multimedia artists
Canadian mixed media artists
20th-century Canadian painters
Canadian male painters
21st-century Canadian painters
Artists from Oshawa
Artists from Alberta
York University alumni
20th-century Canadian male artists
21st-century Canadian male artists